Yuriy Mykhailovych Pohulyaiko (born on 12 November 1978), is a Ukrainian politician, lawyer, and civil servant, who is currently the Governor of Volyn Oblast since 2 December 2019.

Biography

Yuriy Pohulyaiko was born on 12 November 1978.

Education

He graduated from Luhansk State Agrarian University as a manager of organizations and enterprises, Interregional Academy of Personnel Management (lawyer), Academy of Management of the Ministry of Internal Affairs (lawyer).

Employment

Puhulyaiko worked as a district police inspector, detective officer of the branch of the State Service for Combating Economic Crime of the Krasnodon city department of the Ministry of Internal Affairs of Ukraine in the Luhansk Oblast. He served in the positions of privates and commanding officers in the internal affairs bodies of the Ministry of Internal Affairs of Ukraine in the Mykolaiv, Dnepropetrovsk, Chernihiv and Luhansk Oblats, then in the National Police.

He served in the tax police of the Main Department of the SFS of Donetsk region. Pohulyaiko held the position of First Deputy Head of the Luhansk Regional State Administration, since 22 August 2019.

On 30 October 2019, at an extraordinary session, members of the Volyn Oblast Council approved an appeal to the President of Ukraine, in which they disagreed with the personnel decision of the Cabinet of Ministers of Ukraine to approve the appointment of Pohulyaiko as the Governor of Volyn Oblast. He was appointed and took office on 2 December.

Criticism

On 9 April 2020, the Svoboda faction in the Volyn Regional Council declared the imposition of the Russian language, disregarding for the rules of ethical conduct by civil servants and non-compliance with the Constitution of Ukraine and laws of Ukraine  with the law, "On ensuring the functioning of the Ukrainian language as state" language policy".

Personal life

He is married and has two children.

References

1978 births
Living people
People from Luhansk Oblast
Interregional Academy of Personnel Management alumni
Governors of Volyn Oblast